Tzur Moshe (lit. Rock of Moses) is a moshav in central Israel, in the Central district. Located in the Sharon plain near Netanya, it falls under the jurisdiction of Lev HaSharon Regional Council.

History

The village was founded on 13 September 1937 by a group of 20 immigrants from Kastoria, Greece as part of the tower and stockade settlement programme. It was named after Moshe Kofinas, a Greek MP and president of the Greek branch of the National Zionist Organisation in 1919. He raised money from local Jewish donors and funded the purchase of part of the land to be used for the project (funds were also offered by the Carasso family from Thessaloniki), as well as for the Hasmonean city of Tzuran which was located in the area. Kofinas died in 1924, before he could see the plans fulfilled.

Kofinas' unfinished work was carried on by his faithful following: Rabbi Ben-Zion Meir Chai Uzziel, David Florentine, Yosef Uzziel, Moshe Carasso and Leon Recanati, who joined ranks and called themselves by the name, The Dr. Moshe Kofinas Organisation of Greek Immigrants for Settlement. They worked to obtain all the necessary permits, and by 1934 the first immigrants associated with this group arrived in Magdiel. In 1935, the Jewish Agency provided a plot of land for the group near Beit Shean, where they began to build their farming settlement. However, after one year, they were redirected to a place in the Sharon Valley, where they eventually founded the present settlement in September 1937.

On Friday 9 July 2004 the park 'Athens 2004' was dedicated at Zur Moshe. The ceremony took place under the auspices of the Embassy of Greece in Israel. The ambassador Panagiotis Zografos cut the blue ribbon at the entry to the park. The park was established thanks to the support of the Jewish communities and individuals in Israel, Greece, US and elsewhere. It was initiated and designed by architect Elias Messinas and Yvette Nahmia-Messinas, and the late David Fais who oversaw the implementation of the park. Dignitaries included the Ambassador of Greece Panagiotis Zografos, the Consul in Haifa Kostas Zinovios, officials from the Embassy of Greece in Tel Aviv, dignitaries from the Board of the Netanya county and Moshav Zur Moshe, and many visitors of Greek origin from Israel and Greece.

References

External links
http://www.zurmoshe.co.il/ Village website] 

Moshavim
Populated places established in 1937
Populated places in Central District (Israel)
1937 establishments in Mandatory Palestine
Greek-Jewish culture in Israel